Bill Stevenson (born c. 1933) is a former Canadian football player who played for the Calgary Stampeders. He played college football at the University of Toronto.

References

Living people
1933 births
Players of Canadian football from Ontario
Canadian football quarterbacks
Toronto Varsity Blues football players
Calgary Stampeders players
Canadian football people from Toronto